Westtown station is a railroad station in Thornbury Township, Chester County, Pennsylvania. It currently serves as a stop on the West Chester Railroad heritage railway as well as an art gallery.

The station was a stop on the Pennsylvania Railroad's (PRR) West Chester Line, and later became a part of SEPTA's R3 West Chester Line. SEPTA discontinued service in 1986, and the West Chester Railroad resurrected the line for recreational excursions in 1997.

History
Westtown station was built in 1859 by the West Chester and Philadelphia Railroad and was originally called Street Road station, but was renamed "Westtown" in 1888. The Westtown Post Office was established there in 1871, though it has since moved to a new site in an adjacent building.

SEPTA discontinued regular passenger service in September 1986, due to deteriorating track conditions and Chester County's desire to expand facilities at Exton station on SEPTA's Paoli/Thorndale Line. Service was restored by the West Chester Railroad in 1997, a privately owned and operated heritage railway that operates between Glen Mills and West Chester on weekends. The station still stands and is home to an art gallery run by Kenneth Kazanjian, a potter, and Shelly Shultis, a painter.

References

External links
West Chester Railroad's official website

Railway stations closed in 1986
Former SEPTA Regional Rail stations
Former Pennsylvania Railroad stations

Former railway stations in Chester County, Pennsylvania
Railway stations in the United States opened in 1859
Railway stations in the United States opened in 1997